Kannampalayam is a suburb of Coimbatore, in the Indian state of Tamil Nadu. Kannampalayam is a Town Panchayat.

Demographics
 India census, Kannampalayam has a population of 15,868. Males constitute 51.1% of the population and females 49.9%. Kannampalayam has an average literacy rate of 79.2%, higher than the national average of 59.5%: male literacy is 83.3%, and female literacy is 75.2%. In Kannampalayam, 10% of the population is under 6 years of age.

Politics
Kannampalayam is a part of Sulur (state assembly constituency) and Coimbatore (Lok Sabha constituency).

References

Cities and towns in Coimbatore district
Suburbs of Coimbatore